The Gamekillers is a one-hour television special that aired on MTV in the United States on February 6, 2006, and re-aired on The Comedy Network in Canada. It was a cross-promotional event with Axe Dry, who had previously used the "Gamekiller" premise in an ad campaign. Therefore, the television series is known as "branded content".

The "Gamekillers" are a collection of stereotyped characters who represent certain personalities who, according to Axe and the show's producers, teens and 20-somethings often encounter throughout the course of their social life. In particular, each Gamekiller is said to be particularly skilled at inadvertently—or sometimes purposely—ruining a date and breaking up a couple.

Characters 

In the show, each Gamekiller was profiled, and actors playing certain ones were introduced to unsuspecting real-life couples to ruin their dates.

TV series
MTV ordered five half-hour episodes of The Gamekillers, evolving the original 2006 special into a full television series. The first episode premiered on September 21, 2007. In each episode, a male contestant who thinks he is on a simple reality dating show goes on a series of dates with an actress who he believes to be a fellow contestant. Every situation he finds himself in is completely staged, and in every date the contestant is confronted with a Gamekiller, whose purpose is to throw the date off course and ruin the contestant's chances of success. If the contestant overcomes the challenges, his name is etched onto the "ancient Axe Gamekillers Chalice", alongside other such historical ladies' men as Hugh Hefner, Casanova, John Hancock and Sasquatch.

This series reprises some of the Gamekiller roles featured in the original special and introduces several new characters:

References

External links
Official site
Official Canadian site
The GameKillers Game

2000s American television specials
2006 television specials
2006 in American television
MTV original programming